Lanei Chapman (born January 23, 1973) is an American actress. She has appeared primarily in guest appearances on episodes of various television series, and may be best known for her role as Lt. Vanessa Damphousse in the single 1995–96 season of the series Space: Above and Beyond.

Career
Chapman first appeared on television at the age of 13 in a Kentucky Fried Chicken commercial. She went on to appear in a number of films and television shows, including White Men Can't Jump, Seinfeld, The Wonder Years and China Beach. She made her science fiction television debut in Star Trek: The Next Generation as Ensign Sariel Rager, a recurring character who served as a conn officer in numerous episodes, though she only received an on-screen credit for speaking parts in four episodes.

She made her debut in the series Space: Above and Beyond during the pilot episode, playing main cast character Lt. Vanessa Damphousse. While filming the pilot and the early part of the series, Chapman was on a leave of absence from a post-graduate film production program at the University of Southern California.

She initially auditioned with Randy Stone, senior vice-president of talent and casting at Twentieth Century Fox Television, and then two days later with David Nutter, the director of the pilot. By her own admission, the character did not have a great deal to do in that initial two-part episode, so much so that when she was required to audition, the lines she read were from a different character as they had not yet developed Damphousse. The writers took elements of Chapman's own experiences and backstory and wrote it into the new character's as they were developing her. The series was cancelled after one season, despite an organized fan campaign to renew it.

Personal life
Chapman is a graduate of Dartmouth College with a degree in Spanish. She had originally chosen to major in Drama, but switched part-way through after discovering the extent of the foreign language program at the college. She also wrote a short play while there, called Home Run, which she sent to actress Chip Fields to appear in and assist Chapman in directing. She is also a qualified teacher in California, and for a short time taught kindergarten until she chose to pursue acting full-time.

Filmography
 Thief
 episode "In the Wind" (as Lanai Chapman) ... 
 episode "No Direction Home" (as Lanai Chapman) ... as Sheronda Jones
 Dense (2004) ... as Yvette
 The Division
 episode "Wish You Were Here" (as Lanai Chapman) ... as Prosecutor
 episode "Beyond the Grave" (as Lanai Chapman) ... as District Attorney
 The District ... as Jenny McClure
 episode "Goodbye, Jenny"
 episode "Drug Money"
 Judging Amy ... as Winnie Van Exel
 episode "The Frozen Zone" (as Lanai Chapman)
 episode "Between the Wanting and the Getting (as Lanai Chapman)
 episode "Everybody Falls Down" (as Lanai Chapman)
 Rat Race (2001) ...as Merrill Jennings
 C-16: FBI ... as Angela Robinson
 episode "My Brother's Keeper"
 episode "The Art of War"
 The Pretender
 episode "Under the Reds" ... as Julie Thorton
 Space: Above and Beyond ... as Lt. Vanessa Damphousse
 episode "...Tell Our Moms We Done Our Best"
 episode "And If They Lay Us Down To Rest..."
 episode "Sugar Dirt"
 episode "Stardust"
 episode "R&R
 episode "Pearly"
 episode "Dear Earth"
 episode "Toy Soldiers"
 episode "The Angriest Angel"
 episode "Never No More"
 episode "Level of Necessity"
 episode "Who Monitors the Birds?"
 episode "The River of Stars"
 episode "Choice or Chance"
 episode "Hostile Visit"
 episode "The Enemy"
 episode "Eyes"
 episode "Ray Butts"
 episode "Mutiny"
 episode "Pilot"
 The Secrets of Lake Success ... as Melanie Jones
 Seinfeld ... as Sid Fields' Housekeeper
 episode "The Pilot, Part 2"
 episode "The Old Man"
 The Jacksons: An American Dream (1992) TV Mini Series... Played Katherine's sister, Hattie.
 Star Trek: The Next Generation ... as Ensign Sariel Rager, a conn officer of the Enterprise-D
 silently played the role in numerous episodes, only received an on-screen speaking credit in four episodes
 episode "Schisms"
 episode "Relics"
 episode "Night Terrors"
 episode "Galaxy's Child"
 Martin
 episode "Things I Do for Love" (voice) ... as Caller #1
 White Men Can't Jump (1992) ... as Lanei
 The Wonder Years
 episode "Kodachrome" ... as Miss Shaw
 The Importance of Being Earnest (1992) ... as Cecily
 China Beach
 episode "Souvenirs" ... as Glitter
 A Mother's Courage: The Mary Thomas Story (1989) ... Mary (16 years)

References

External links 
 
 

1973 births
African-American actresses
American educators
American film actresses
American television actresses
Dartmouth College alumni
Living people
21st-century African-American people
21st-century African-American women
20th-century African-American people
20th-century African-American women